Moyasimon: Tales of Agriculture, known in Japan as , is a manga series created by Masayuki Ishikawa. An 11-episode anime television series adaptation, animated by Shirogumi and Telecom Animation Film, aired between October and December 2007. A second season titled Moyasimon Returns aired between July and September 2012. The series follows Tadayasu Sawaki, a first-year college student at an agricultural university, who has a unique ability to see and communicate with bacteria and other micro-organisms. A live action series based on the manga was also produced. Both the two anime series and the live action series are parts of the Noitamina programming block on Fuji Television.

Anime series

Moyasimon

Moyasimon Returns

Live action series

Moyasimon